Buford is an unincorporated community in Mitchell County, in the U.S. state of Texas. According to the Handbook of Texas, the community had a population of 25 in 2000.

History
Buford was originally named Armenderez for an old mill located there. Its name was later changed to Belen, then to Buford in honor of El Paso resident Buford Orndorff. A post office was established at Buford in 1907 and remained in operation until 1913. Mail was then routed to the community from Colorado City. The community had two churches, three businesses, and 90 residents in 1947. Its population was 25 from 1980 through 2000.

Geography

Climate
According to the Köppen Climate Classification system, Buford has a semi-arid climate, abbreviated "BSk" on climate maps.

Education
Buford had its own school in 1947. Today the community is served by the Colorado Independent School District.

References

Unincorporated communities in Mitchell County, Texas
Unincorporated communities in Texas